1º Batalhão de Forças Especiais (1º B F Esp) (English: 1st Special Forces Battalion) is a counter-terrorism (CT) unit of the Brazilian Army.

History

The Battalion was initially formed in 1957 as a jungle rescue unit. However, in 1968 it was reorganized as a special forces unit. In 1983 the unit was expanded and placed under the parachute infantry brigade structure.

Role

The Battalion's mission is similar to that of the Green Beret units; however, because they have the CT mission, they have modified their organization to more closely follow Britain's Special Air Service and American's Delta Force. The SF Battalion falls within the Army's Special Operations Command and is located in Goiânia.

The battalion is capable of conducting its missions independently from or in conjunction with conventional forces. Battalion troops are trained in jungle warfare at the Army's CIGS jungle warfare school and in amphibious, mountain warfare, airborne, airmobile and HAHO/HALO operations. They are also prepared for long-range reconnaissance in addition to their CT operations.

Equipment

References

External links
Special Operations

Counterterrorist organizations
Special forces of Brazil
Year of establishment missing